Nicolò Barbaro, son of Marco, was a Venetian nobleman and author of an eyewitness account, written in Venetian vernacular, of the Ottoman siege and conquest of Byzantine Constantinople in 1453 (also referred to as the Fall of Constantinople).

While Barbaro refers to himself in his account as the medic of the galleys (“el miedego dele galie”), and he is therefore typically referred to in scholarship as the ship’s doctor or physician, recent research  shows that he served as crossbowman on the annual mercantile convoy to Constantinople of that year. This was an assignment that he also held on other convoys before and after 1453. It is not clear whether he performed both functions on the voyage to Constantinople, and why he referred to himself as medic, only. His curriculum vitae, to the extent that it has been reconstructed, shows no sign of a medical training or career.

Born in 1427 or 1428, Barbaro was not yet 25 years old when he became involved in the defense of Constantinople. He was a blood relative of the captain of the mercantile convoy, Alvise Diedo, son of Marco, who is often mentioned in his account.

The historian Steven Runciman called him 'the most useful of the Western sources' on the fall of the city in 1453, primarily because of the compelling narrative that follows the events of the siege on a daily basis. However, as a Venetian, Barbaro held strong anti-Genoese beliefs - especially against the Genoese of Pera (modern day Galata), whom he suggests were colluding with the Ottomans during the siege. He also suggests that Zuan Zustignan, the Genoese commander stationed at the Mesoteichion (Μεσοτείχιον, "Middle Wall"), the weakest part of the Theodosian Walls, abandoned his post, and that this led to the fall of the city:

"Zuan Zustignan, that Genoese of Genoa, decided to abandon his post, and fled to his ship, which was lying at the boom. The Emperor [Constantine XI] had made this Zuan Zustignan captain of his forces, and as he fled, he went through the city crying 'The Turks have got into the city!' But he lied through his teeth, because the Turks were not yet inside."

However, Leonard of Chios, another eyewitness, says that Zustignan was injured by an arrow, and attempted to seek out a physician in secret. The Greek historians Doukas and Laonikos Chalkokondyles both also say that Zustignan was injured too – only Barbaro claims that the Genoese commander fled in such a way.

Serious as these criticisms are, Barbaro's account has presented a solid chronological narrative that presents the events of the Siege of Constantinople day-by-day. Moreover, his account is valuable in providing the names of over 100 Venetians who were in Constantinople at the time of the siege. 

While Barbaro is believed to have concluded writing his narrative of events by 1472, he continued working on his manuscript for decades afterwards, by keeping a running tally of the Venetian noblemen, present during the siege, who had since died. Internal evidence indicates that he stopped working on the manuscript between 1503 and 1507. Barbaro may have been the last surviving Venetian nobleman who had been involved in the defense of 1453, as he is reported to have died in 1521.

References

Physicians from Venice
15th-century Italian physicians
Italian chroniclers
15th-century Venetian writers
Niccolo